Teodor Corban (28 April 1957 – 17 January 2023) was a Romanian actor.

Filmography
 One Floor Below (2015) - Pătrașcu
 Aferim! (2015) - Constantin
 A Very Unsettled Summer (2013) - The Boss (as Teo Corban)
 Child's Pose (2013) - Mr. Şerban
 Beyond the Hills (2012) - Police inspector
 From Now On (Short) (2012) - Constantin
 Bora Bora (Short) (2011) - Inspector
 Francesca (2009) - Ion
 Portrait of the Fighter as a Young Man (2010) - Teodor
 Tales from the Golden Age (2009) - The Mayor (segment "The Legend of the Official Visit")
 The Yellow Smiley Face (2008) - Florin Popescu
 4 Months, 3 Weeks and 2 Days (2007) - Unirea Hotel receptionist (as Teo Corban)
 Inimă de țigan (2007) - Stelică
 California Dreamin' (2007) - Secretary of State
 12:08 East of Bucharest (Romanian title:A fost sau n-a fost?) (2006) - Virgil Jderescu
 Lombarzilor 8 (TV Series) (2006) - Vasile
 A Trip to the City (Short) (2003) - The Mayor

Awards
Corban won a Gopo award for "Best actor in a leading role" in the 2016 film Bravo!.

References

External links 
 
 

1957 births
2023 deaths
20th-century Romanian male actors
21st-century Romanian male actors
Actors from Iași
Romanian male film actors
Romanian male stage actors
Romanian male television actors